Cissus bicolor is a species of vine. It is an accepted name

References

bicolor